God's Country and the Man may refer to:
 God's Country and the Man (1937 film), an American Western film
 God's Country and the Man (1931 film), an American Western film